Åsa Wettergren (born 1969) is an associate professor in the Department of Sociology at the University of Gothenburg. Her research interests include social movements, migration, processes of identification and change in organization and society, and the sociology of emotions.

Education
 Ph.D. from Karlstad University, 2005

Notable publications
Wettergren, Å., "Like Moths to a Flame: Culture Jamming and the Global Spectacle"
Fun and Laughter: Culture Jamming & the Emotional Regime of Late Capitalism

References

External links 
 Faculty Listing for Åsa Wettergren at the University of Gothenburg

Living people
1969 births
Academic staff of the University of Gothenburg
Karlstad University alumni
Swedish women sociologists
Swedish women academics
Journalism academics